The Balranald railway line was a Victorian Railways broad gauge line that branched from Barnes on the Deniliquin railway line and ran to Balranald.  The building of the line was sanctioned under the Border Railways Act 1922.

The Balranald branch line was opened on 26 March 1926.  The section from Moulamein to Balranald was closed in 1986.  The bridge across Yanga Creek near Balranald was subsequently demolished to make way for a realignment of the Sturt Highway. Segments between Caldwell and Moulamein and Barnes and Caldwell were closed in 2006 and 2008 respectively.

References

Closed regional railway lines in New South Wales
Railway lines opened in 1926
Railway lines closed in 2008
5 ft 3 in gauge railways in Australia